The Chery Arrizo 5 is a compact sedan produced by Chery. The Chery Arrizo 5 received a name change to Chery Arrizo EX from 2019 to 2020 and the name was changed back to Chery Arrizo 5. The Arrizo 5 also spawned a more upmarket model based on the same platform called the Arrizo 6 or Arrizo GX that debuted during the 2018 Beijing Auto Show, with the model name being changed again to Arrizo 5 Plus after the facelift in 2021.

Overview
The Arrizo 5 was previewed by the Chery Concept Alpha that debuted on the 2014 Beijing Auto Show and the Chery Alpha 5 concept that was unveiled at the 2015 Shanghai Auto Show.

The engines available includes a 1.5 liter engine with 116hp and 148nm, mated to a five-speed manual transmission or a CVT. Later adding a 1.2 liter turbo engine producing 132hp and 212nm and a 1.5 liter turbo engine with 145hp and 220nm. The production version of the Chery Arrizo 5 sedan debuted during the 2015 Guangzhou Auto Show and pricing for the Arrizo 5 will be from 63,900 to 82,900 yuan.

Arrizo EX
From 2019 to 2020 the facelift model of the Arrizo 5 was briefly sold as the Arrizo EX with the slightly more upmarket Arrizo GX being sold alongside as a more premium option. The name was changed back to Arrizo 5 in 2020 and the Arrizo GX was changed to Arrizo 5 Plus for the facelift of the 2021 model year.

Arrizo 5 Sport
The Arrizo 5 Sport is the performance variant of the Arrizo 5. The Arrizo 5 Sport gets a body kit including a redesigned front bumper, side skirts, new 5 spoke alloys, red brake calipers, a spoiler on the rear deck, and red interior trim. Pricing for the Arrizo 5 Sport starts from 76,900 yuan to 97,900 yuan.

Arrizo 5e
The Chery Arrizo 5e is an electric car based on the Arrizo 5 sedan. It debuted in June 2017 with a range of 410 kilometers.

Sinogold Junxing
A rebadged variant called the Junxing (骏行) was produced under the Sinogold brand following the takeover of the Sinogold brand by Chery due to the previous slow sales and high debt of Sinogold. The model was registered for production in December 2021 with the code name SGA7000BEV3 used for the Sinogold variant. It was reported to be produced from February with a power output of 120kW.

References

External links
Official website

Arrizo 5
Arrizo 5
Compact cars
Sedans
Cars of China
Cars of Brazil
Cars introduced in 2016
Production electric cars